The following outline is provided as an overview of and topical guide to acting:

Acting – work of an actor or actress, which is a person in theatre, television, film, or any other storytelling medium who tells the story by portraying a character and, usually, speaking or singing the written text or play.

What type of thing is acting? 
Acting can be described as all of the following:

 one of the arts –
 a performing art – form of art in which artists use their voices, bodies or inanimate objects to convey artistic expression. It is different from visual arts, which is when artists use paint, canvas or various materials to create physical or static art objects. Performing arts include a range of disciplines which are performed in front of a live audience.

Acting techniques 

Classical acting – philosophy of acting that integrates the expression of the body, voice, imagination, personalizing, improvisation, external stimuli, and script analysis. It is based on the theories and systems of select classical actors and directors including Konstantin Stanislavski and Michel Saint-Denis.
 Meisner technique – requires the actor to focus totally on the other actor as though he or she is real and they only exist in that moment. This is a method that makes the actors in the scene seem more authentic to the audience. It is based on the principle that acting finds its expression in people's response to other people and circumstances. It is based on Stanislavski's system.
 Method acting – range of techniques based on for training actors to achieve better characterizations of the characters they play, as formulated by Lee Strasberg. Strasberg's method is based upon the idea that in order to develop an emotional and cognitive understanding of their roles, actors should use their own experiences to identify personally with their characters. It is based on aspects of Stanislavski's system.
 Practical aesthetics – acting technique originally conceived by David Mamet and William H. Macy, based on the teachings of Stanislavsky, Sanford Meisner, and the Stoic philosopher Epictetus.
 Stanislavski's system – method in which actors draw upon their own feelings and experiences to convey the "truth" of the character they are portraying. The actor puts himself or herself in the mindset of the character finding things in common in order to give a more genuine portrayal of the character.

History of acting 

History of acting
 History of theatre
 History of classical acting

Scholars on acting 
James Lipton

Some famous actors 

 Lists of actors
 List of Asian Academy Award winners and nominees
 List of Black Academy Award winners and nominees

Actors trained in the classical tradition 

Some well-known classically trained actors include:

Peggy Ashcroft
Richard Attenborough
Ethel Barrymore
John Barrymore
Lionel Barrymore
Angela Bassett
Alan Bates
Cate Blanchett
Dirk Bogarde
Kenneth Branagh
Richard Burton
James Cagney
Gwendoline Christie
Frances Conroy
Tom Courtenay
Benedict Cumberbatch
Timothy Dalton
Bette Davis
Judi Dench
Robert Donat
Chiwetel Ejiofor
Edith Evans
Joseph Fiennes
Ralph Fiennes
Albert Finney
Kate Fleetwood
John Gielgud
Alec Guinness
Richard Harris
Rex Harrison
Katharine Hepburn
Tom Hiddleston
Ian Holm
Anthony Hopkins
John Hurt
Jeremy Irons
Derek Jacobi
Felicity Jones
Dame Celia Johnson
Boris Karloff
Ben Kingsley
Elsa Lanchester
Angela Lansbury
Charles Laughton
Vivien Leigh
John Lithgow
Richard Madden
James Mason
James McAvoy
Ian McKellen
Helen Mirren
Eve Myles
Laurence Olivier
David Oyelowo
Christopher Plummer
Pete Postlethwaite
Sreejith Ramanan
Basil Rathbone
Corin Redgrave
Lynn Redgrave
Michael Redgrave
Vanessa Redgrave
Eddie Redmayne
Ralph Richardson
Alan Rickman
Geoffrey Rush
Margaret Rutherford
Mark Rylance
Alastair Sim
Paul Scofield
William Shatner
Dame Maggie Smith
Timothy Spall
Patrick Stewart
David Tennant
Emma Thompson
Sybil Thorndike
Luke Treadaway
Peter O'Toole
Polly Walker
David Warner
Orson Welles
May Whitty

Method actors 

 James Dean
 Jane Fonda
 Dustin Hoffman
 Marilyn Monroe
 Paul Newman
 Jack Nicholson
 Al Pacino
 George Peppard
 Mickey Rourke

Acting awards 

 Academy Award for Best Actor
 Academy Award for Best Actress
 Academy Award for Best Supporting Actor
 Academy Award for Best Supporting Actress
 Academy Juvenile Award

See also 

 Outline of entertainment
 Outline of film
 Outline of theatre

References

External links 

 Outline
acting
acting